Salem Weekly (formerly Salem Monthly) was an alternative newspaper publication in Salem, Oregon, United States. The semi-weekly paper was established as a monthly in April 2003 and closed in November 2018. It was owned and published by Andrew Paul "A.P." Walther.

History
The Salem Monthly traces its origins to a coffee house in downtown Salem, Oregon known as the Coffee House Cafe. Dating back to the mid-1990s, the Coffee House Cafe served as a popular meeting place and hangout for Salem's youth culture. In its later years of operation, the cafe began publishing a newsletter to engage customers in Salem's community and cultural affairs. Inspired by the reaction to the cafe's newsletter, cafe owner A.P. Walther decided to start up a publishing operation for an alternative newspaper in Salem, Oregon.

Salem Weekly celebrated 10 years of operation in April 2013.

On November 28, 2018, the Statesman Journal reported the closure of Salem Weekly, which the Weekly announced in a letter relayed to the Statesman via local blogger Brian Hines. The last issue of the paper was published on October 25.

Topics
Topics covered in past issues include: the stigma of living on welfare; the dangers of pollution and whether recycling helps; Chemeketa Community College's financial struggles; local gay citizens' reactions to the nullification of gay marriages that took place in Multnomah County; local residents' experiences of racism; internment of Japanese, Italian, and German Americans during World War II; the Native American perspective on Thanksgiving; Bush's abuses of power; Noam Chomsky and the Iraq War.

Mission
Publisher A.P. Walther says Salem Monthly was created to give Salem "exposure to local news, thought, and culture in the greater Salem area."

References

External links
Salem Weekly (official site)

2005 establishments in Oregon
Alternative weekly newspapers published in the United States
Mass media in Salem, Oregon
Newspapers published in Oregon
Oregon Newspaper Publishers Association
Newspapers established in 2005
Defunct newspapers published in Oregon
Defunct weekly newspapers
Independent newspapers published in the United States